Prinsesse Ragnhild may refer to:
 Princess Ragnhild, Mrs. Lorentzen  (1930 – 2012)
 MS Prinsesse Ragnhild or MV Jimei, a 1966 Norwegian ferry
 MS Prinsesse Ragnhild or MS Bahamas Celebration, a 1981 Norwegian ferry
 SS Prinsesse Ragnhild, a 1931 Norwegian coastal express ship, sunk in 1940